Ivica Klaić (born 15 April 1964) is a Croatian taekwondo practitioner. He competed for Yugoslavia in the men's flyweight at the 1988 Summer Olympics.

References

External links
 

1964 births
Sportspeople from Zagreb
Living people
Croatian male taekwondo practitioners
Olympic taekwondo practitioners of Croatia
Taekwondo practitioners at the 1988 Summer Olympics
20th-century Croatian people